Peter Nelson may refer to:

 Peter Nelson (actor) (born 1959), American actor
 Peter Nelson (b. 1852) (1852–1928), Danish-born American politician
 Peter Nelson (b. 1861) (1861–1938), Norwegian-born American politician
 Peter Nelson (cyclist) (1931–1977), Australian cyclist
 Peter Nelson (researcher), American professor and artificial intelligence researcher
 Peter Nelson, 9th Earl Nelson (1941–2009), British peer
 Peter Nelson Mwanza (born 1937), Malawian politician
 Peter Nelson (rugby union) (born 1992), Northern Irish rugby player
 Peter C. Nelson (1948–2013), American politician
 Peter Nelson (cricketer, born 1918) (1918–1992), English cricketer
 Peter Nelson (cricketer, born 1913) (1913–1998), English cricketer and British Army officer